Leonardo Lavalle defeated Eduardo Vélez in the final, 6–4, 6–4 to win the boys' singles tennis title at the 1985 Wimbledon Championships.

Seeds

  Leonardo Lavalle (champion)
  Christer Allgårdh (first round)
  Jaime Yzaga (semifinals)
  Jason Goodall (first round)
  Patrick Flynn (first round)
  Agustín Moreno (first round)
  Franco Davín (third round)
  João Silva (quarterfinals)
  Brett Custer (third round)
  John Boytim (third round)
  Joey Blake (second round)
  Claudio Pistolesi (first round)
  Guillermo Pérez Roldán (second round)
  Shuzo Matsuoka (third round)
  Sergio Cortés (first round)
  Felix Barrientos (semifinals)

Draw

Finals

Top half

Section 1

Section 2

Bottom half

Section 3

Section 4

References

External links

Boys' Singles
Wimbledon Championship by year – Boys' singles